Coreno Ausonio is a comune (municipality) in the Province of Frosinone in the Italian region Lazio, located about  southeast of Rome and about  southeast of Frosinone at the foot of Monte Maio, in the Monti Aurunci.

It includes an ancient carved grotto, the Grotta delle Fate ("Fairies' Grotto", 8th century BC), likely a tomb of one of the Osco-Sabellian tribes that lived here at the time.

Twin towns
 Błonie, Poland

References

Cities and towns in Lazio